Orie Steele (March 20, 1887 – 1960) was an American motorcycle hillclimb national champion in the 1920s and 1930s. Steele was born in Paterson, New Jersey.

His career began in 1913 riding endurance races. He raced for Indian  Company. His father John Steele owned an Indian  dealership in Paterson, New Jersey. After early success in endurance racing, including winning the 500 mile 1914 Yonkers Endurance Run, he stopped racing during World War One. At this time he worked with the Army outfitting motorcycles and training men how to ride them. After the war's end he returned to competition and began winning races all over the country, primarily in motorcycle hillclimbs, and was prominently featured in Indian's advertising.

Steele was inducted into the Motorcycle Hall of Fame in October 2007.

References

External links
Orie Steele tribute site

1887 births
1960 deaths
American motorcycle racers
Sportspeople from Paterson, New Jersey